Timonius is a genus of plants in the family Rubiaceae. It is the second most specious genus in the family in Papua New Guinea, containing about 80 species known to science, for example (but this list may be incomplete):

 Timonius jambosella (Gaertn.) Thwaites
 Timonius timon (Spreng.) Merr.

References 

Rubiaceae genera
Guettardeae
Taxonomy articles created by Polbot